Luman may refer to:

 Luman (name), a list of people with the given name or surname
 Luman Land District, a land district (cadastral division) of Western Australia
 Luman, Iran, a village

See also 
 Luman Andrews House, built in 1745
 Lumen (disambiguation)
 Loman (disambiguation)

de:Luman